Saw palm may refer to:

Acoelorrhaphe wrightii
Serenoa repens